Stanowice   is a village in the administrative district of Gmina Bogdaniec, within Gorzów County, Lubusz Voivodeship, in western Poland.

The village has a population of 390.

Notable residents
 Paul Ebel (1916 – 1986), highly decorated Wehrmacht soldier

References

Stanowice